Blora is a district in Blora Regency, Central Java, Indonesia. The district borders Rembang Regency to the north, Jepon District to the east and south, and Banjarejo District and Tunjungan District to the west. It is also the administrative capital of Blora Regency. During the period of 1928–31, it was also the seat of Blora Residency.

Administrative divisions 
Blora consists of 16 rural villages (desa) and 12 urban villages (kelurahan):

Geography

Climate 
Blora features a tropical monsoon climate (Am). The district features distinctly wetter and drier months, with June through August being the driest months.

References 

Blora Regency